Circumcise Me is a 2008 film about the American-born Israeli comedian Yisrael Campbell.

It was produced by Matthew Kalman, foreign news correspondent in Jerusalem for USA Today, Canada's Globe & Mail and other newspapers, and David Blumenfeld, an Israel-based photographer who has photographed for Time, Newsweek and other publications.

The film, originally screened under the title It's Not in Heaven: The Comedy of Yisrael Campbell, is about a Catholic convert to Judaism who has become a stand-up comedy star in Israel. Campbell's routine riffs on the fact that he converted to Judaism three times, once Reform, once Conservative and once Orthodox.

The Economist calls the film "hilarious and moving".

The film has been screened in Toronto and Jerusalem, and was scheduled to be released in the United States autumn 2008.

References

External links
 

2008 films
Documentary films about Jews and Judaism
Stand-up comedy concert films
2008 comedy films
2000s English-language films